El Harrach is a town and commune in Algeria.

It may also refer to:

Places
 El Harrach District, a district in Algeria.
 Oued El Harrach, a river in Algeria.
 El Harrach Stadium, a stadium in Algeria.

Transport
 El Harrach Centre Station, a metro station in Algeria.
 El Harrach Gare Station, a metro station in Algeria.

History
 Massacre of El Harrach (1832), a massacre during the French conquest of Algeria.

Sport
 USM El Harrach, a football club in Algeria.